TDRS-6, known before launch as TDRS-F, is an American communications satellite, of first generation, which is operated by NASA as part of the Tracking and Data Relay Satellite System. It was constructed by TRW, and is based on a custom satellite bus which was used for all seven first generation TDRS satellites.

History

TDRS-F was deployed from  during the STS-54 mission in 1993. Endeavour was launched from Launch Complex 39B at the Kennedy Space Center, at 13:59:30 UTC on 13 January 1993. TDRS-F was deployed from Endeavour around six hours after launch, and was raised to geosynchronous orbit by means of an Inertial Upper Stage.

Deployment
The two-stage solid-propellent Inertial Upper Stage made two burns. The first stage burn occurred shortly after deployment from Endeavour, and placed the satellite into a geosynchronous transfer orbit (GTO). At 02:26 UTC on 14 January 1993, it reached apogee, and the second stage fired, placing TDRS-F into geosynchronous orbit. At this point, it received its operational designation, TDRS-6.

Operation
In 1994, it was placed at a longitude 46.0° West of the Greenwich Meridian, to serve as an on-orbit spare. In 1996, it was moved to 47.0° West, where it remained until 2005, when it was repositioned to 174.0° West, where, it was used to provide communications with spacecraft in Earth orbit, such as the International Space Station (ISS) and spacecraft bringing astronauts to the ISS.

See also 

 List of TDRS satellites

References 

Communications satellites in geostationary orbit
Spacecraft launched in 1993
TDRS satellites
Spacecraft launched by the Space Shuttle